''FIRST Steamworks, stylized as FIRST'' STEAMworks, was the FIRST Robotics Competition game for the 2017 season. As in past games, two alliances of three individual teams and their robots compete on a field to score "match" point to win the game and ranking points to advance to playoff rounds. The game has a steampunk theme and teams are required to shoot wiffle balls which represent fuel into a simulated boiler which transfers the generated steam into an airship in the middle of the field. Each alliance has one airship, which they pressurize with steam from the boiler and load with plastic gears from the field. At the end of the match, robots can climb and hang on team-supplied ropes (or standard ropes supplied by FIRST) attached to the airship for additional points.

Kickoff 
The Kickoff event for FIRST Steamworks occurred on Saturday January 7, 2017. The kickoff video featured the theme song for the season, "Steam Powered" by Professor Elemental, and an explanation of the game. The video was livestreamed at 10:30 AM ET, with many teams attending "local Kickoff Events" to kickstart their build season.

Field 
It is divided into the Neutral Zone, alliance specific Launchpads, Keys and Retrieval Zones.

Neutral Zone 
The Neutral Zone is an area in the middle of the field that contains no major scoring elements, and is neutral to both alliances. It is bounded by the Launchpad Lines, white in colour, and the Launchpad Lines are not part of the Neutral Zone.

Launchpad 
Each side of the arena is called the Launchpad. The Launchpad is alliance specific, bounded by the Launchpad Lines and the Alliance Wall. Each Launchpad belongs to the alliance that has their Alliance Wall bounding it. Robots start the match contacting the Alliance Wall. The Launchpad contains the Key, Retrieval Zone and the Airship.

Key 
The Key is the area in front of the Boiler. It is bounded by alliance-coloured tape and the Boiler and is contained inside the alliance's own Launchpad. Opposing robots may not stay in the Key for more than 5 seconds, as this would obstruct the alliance from scoring in the Boiler.

Retrieval Zone 
The Retrieval Zone is the area in front of the Loading Station. It is inside the opposite alliance's Launchpad, meaning that the robot must travel to the other side of the field to get to the Loading Station. Robots in the Retrieval Zone normally receive scoring elements through the Loading Stations. Robots may not contact another robot in the opposing Retrieval Zone, regardless of who initiates the contact.

Alliance Station and Loading Lanes 
The Alliance Station is the area behind the Alliance Wall where drivers are stationed. They control their robots from the Driver Stations inside the Alliance Station, behind the Alliance Wall. Behind the Alliance Station is the Loading Lane, belonging to the opposite alliance. Human Players are stationed in the Loading Lanes, with a supply of both gears and fuel to deposit through the Loading Stations to the robots, who then score points with them. Both areas are bounded by alliance-coloured tape. The Loading Station is the only way to get more gears after the start of the match and one of the two ways to get more fuel, the other being the Hoppers.

Boiler 
The Boiler is located at the corner of the field, belonging to the alliance that has its Alliance Wall next to it and their Key in front of it. The Low Efficiency Goal is low enough for robots to dump fuel into, though the High Efficiency Goal is too high to do that, so fuel must be launched upwards into it. Fuel may only be launched from an alliance's own Launchpad.

Hoppers 
There are five Hoppers stationed around the field, on the guardrails. There are polycarbonate plates on the guardrails. If these are hit by a robot, 2 containers of fuel (1 Hopper) are released onto the field. There are 50 fuel in each container and 100 fuel in each Hopper. Hoppers are neutral with one in each Launchpad and the rest in the Neutral Zone, so any alliance can use the Hoppers. This is one of the two ways robots can get more fuel after the game starts, with the other being the Loading Station.

Airship 
The Airship is located in the centre of the alliance's Launchpad, is hexagonal in shape and is the main way alliances score points. Two Human Players, known as Pilots, are stationed inside the Airship. On the Airship there are 3 lifts with pegs for robots to deposit gears onto and a cable to let the Pilots pull the gears from the pegs onto the Airship. The lifts are on the 3 faces that are closest to the Alliance Wall. Pegs consist of a plastic spike and a spring that bends, which may cause the gear to fall off the peg while it is being lifted into the Airship. There are bumpers that separate the pegs, with each on the corner of the face. The edge of the bumpers also define the Base Line, a line marked with green tape that is parallel to the Alliance Wall and touching the edge of the bumpers. Also on the Airship are davits, which each hold a rope and a Touchpad. The davits are positioned with one on the side of the hexagon facing the Alliance Wall and the others two faces away. At the end of the game, the robots attempt to climb the ropes connected to the davits, activating the Touchpad. In the middle of the Airship is the Steam Tank, which displays lights for how much fuel has been scored in the Boiler and also where the first gear is placed to activate the first rotor. The other gears must be placed on the sides of the Airship, with an increasing number of gears required for each succeeding rotor. The second rotor requires 2 gears, the third requires 4 gears and the fourth requires 6 gears. There is one reserve "free" gear that is pre-placed on the Airship for the Pilots to use, however it cannot be used in the Autonomous period.

Gameplay and Scoring

Scoring Elements 
There are two major scoring elements in the FIRST Steamworks game, namely fuel and gears. Fuel are plastic wiffleballs with 26 holes in them, are "Screamin' Yellow" in colour, weigh about  each, with a  diameter. Robots may control as many fuel as they wish, but only 1 gear at a time. Ropes are also regulated.

Autonomous Period 
Robots start the match contacting their Alliance Wall, with up to 1 gear and up to 10 fuel preloaded on the robot. The first 15 seconds of the match is called the Autonomous Period. Robots are controlled by pre-programmed commands with no driver input, hence they operate autonomously. Drivers and Human Players must stand behind the white Starting Line during Autonomous to ensure this is the case. Pilots, however, may still operate the lifts and place gears/turn rotors during Autonomous, but may not touch the reserve gear. Each rotor that is activated in Autonomous gives the alliance 60 points, each fuel scored in the High Goal is worth 1 kilopascal and each fuel scored in the Low Goal is worth  kilopascals. Also, if a robot crosses the Base Line, it earns 5 points. If a rotor is engaged in Autonomous, the yellow stack lights next to it will illuminate.

Teleop Period 
After the Autonomous Period ends, the Teleop Period (Tele-operated) begins. It lasts for 135 seconds and robots are controlled by driver inputs. Rotors that are engaged in Teleop earns the alliance 40 points, fuel in the High Goal is worth  kilopascals and fuel in the Low Goal is worth  kilopascals. At the end of the match, each whole kilopascal accumulated throughout both periods is worth 1 point.

End Game 
The last 30 seconds of the Teleop Period is called the End Game. In the End Game, Pilots deploy the ropes on the Airship to let the robots climb them. Each robot that climbs a rope and activates a Touchpad for at least 1 second and when the game timer reaches 0 earns 50 points for their alliance.

Special Scoring 
There are some other ways that alliances can score points. If an alliance scores at least 40 kilopascals throughout the match, they earn 1 extra Ranking Point for qualification matches and 20 points for playoff matches. Also, if an alliance gets all four rotors turning by the end of the match, they score 1 extra Ranking Point for qualification matches and 100 points for playoff matches. Another way to score extra points is by penalties. If the opposing alliance breaks the rules, they may receive a Foul or a Tech Foul. A Foul is 5 points to the other alliance and a Tech Foul is 25 points to the other alliance.

Scoring Summary

Events 

FIRST holds many competitions around the world in the 7 week season, with many teams qualifying for the FIRST Championship each event. Only regional and district championship events are listed.

Week 1

Week 2

Week 3

Week 4

Week 5

Week 6

Week 7

FIRST Championship

Results 
The following tables show the winners of the subdivisions and finals at each FIRST Championship event, as well as the Festival of Champions

Houston

Subdivision Winners

Einstein

Round Robin 
<onlyinclude>

Finals

St. Louis

Subdivision Winners

Einstein

Round Robin 
<onlyinclude>

Finals

Festival of Champions

References 

FIRST Robotics Competition games
Robotics competitions
2017 in robotics